Anastasiya Prasolova (born 19 October 1989) was an Azerbaijani group rhythmic gymnast, and is a coach.

She participated at the 2008 Summer Olympics in Beijing. She also competed at world championships, including at the 2005, 2007, 2009, 2010 and 2011 World Rhythmic Gymnastics Championships. In 2012, she became a certified gymnastics coach.

References

1989 births
Living people
Azerbaijani rhythmic gymnasts
Place of birth missing (living people)
Gymnasts at the 2008 Summer Olympics
Olympic gymnasts of Azerbaijan
20th-century Azerbaijani women
21st-century Azerbaijani women